Municipio XV (or Municipality 15) is one of the 15 administrative subdivisions of the city of Rome in Italy.

References

External links 

Municipi of Rome